A69 or A-69 may refer to:

 A69 road (England), a road in England
 A69 type, another name for the D'Estienne d'Orves class of French anti-submarine corvettes
 Benoni Defense, Encyclopaedia of Chess Openings code
 HLA-A69, an HLA-A serotype
 Abashiri Station, a station in Abashiri, Hokkaido, Japan, station code A69